South Georgia State College is a public college in Douglas and Waycross, Georgia. It is part of the University System of Georgia.

History

Eleventh District A & M School 
On August 18, 1906, the Georgia General Assembly enacted the Perry Act approving the construction of a secondary-level school in each of Georgia's congressional districts. At the time, few rural residents of Georgia received more than an eighth-grade education. The Eleventh District A & M School was one of the eleven (later twelve) educational centers created to cater to the predominantly agricultural-based economy in Georgia.

Douglas, the seat of government for Coffee County, was selected as one of the original eleven towns for the location of an A & M school. Unlike other towns in the Eleventh District, Douglas added free water and electricity for ten years to its bid as an extra incentive. Douglas was a fast-growing town with a population that grew from only 617 in 1900 to 1,600 people in 1907. Construction started the same year and the agriculture school began offering classes in 1908. Charles Wesley Davis, a Tennessee-native, was hired as the first principal with the mandate to develop a comprehensive high school curriculum beyond vocational studies.

South Georgia College 
The school became Georgia's first state-supported two-year college in 1927. In 1932 South Georgia State College emerged as one of the original 26 institutions of the University System of Georgia. Joseph Meriwether Thrash (1885-1947) joined the faculty in 1907, and later served as the fifth principal of the A & M School. He became the college's first president in 1927.

The other original school, Waycross College, was established by the University System of Georgia as a two-year college in the Ware County-Waycross area by the Board of Regents in December 1970. A site for the College was approved by the Board in February 1973 and the name Waycross Junior College was approved by the Board of Regents in January 1975. The institution opened for classes in September 1976. In June 1987, the name was officially changed to Waycross College. Dr. James Dye was its first president, serving in that capacity until 1996.

In January 2012, the Board of Regents of the University System of Georgia approved the merger of South Georgia College with Waycross College. The new institution was established in January 2013 as South Georgia State College.

Campus

The Eleventh District A & M School-South Georgia College Historic District was named a historic district on the National Register of Historic Places in 2010. Some of the contributing buildings and structures are the 1907 semi-circular drive with the surrounding buildings: Peterson Hall, Davis Hall, and Powell Hall that were designed by Haralson Bleckley, the Atlanta architect who also designed Georgia's other A & M Schools. Other buildings include the IT-Nursing Building, Stubbs Hall, Tanner Hall, and Alumni House.

Library

Holdings in the South Georgia State College William S. Smith Library exceed 100,000 items, including reference books, bound periodicals, government documents, pamphlets, maps and videotapes. The library subscribes to 327 journals and ten newspapers. Back issues are available in a variety of formats: CD-ROM, paper, microfiche and microfilm. GALILEO (Georgia Library Learning Online, a statewide initiative) links SGSC's library with others in Georgia to offer more than 100 generalized and specialized research databases. The reference area also offers CD-ROM based indexes to general periodicals and newspapers. Computer workstations offer access to the Internet through the campus network. Word-processing software is also available.

Organization and administration 
South Georgia State College is accredited by the Commission on Colleges of the Southern Association of Colleges and Schools to award certificates and associate degrees. South Georgia State College is also certified under the National League for Nursing and the Georgia Board of Nursing.

Academic profile 
About half of all faculty members have Ph.D. degrees or equivalent. There are no graduate assistants teaching classes at South Georgia State College. Students at SGSC go on to four-year institutions as SGSC is a two-year and four-year residential campus.

Student facilities

Wellness Center Complex 

The Wellness Center Complex features racquetball courts, a free-weight area, an aquatic center, exercise rooms, aerobics, and a gymnasium containing a basketball/volleyball court. The aquatic center features an indoor swimming pool, locker rooms, outdoor patio, and classroom space.

Housing

Tiger Village I 
In 2007, the college completed construction of Tiger Village, a 250-bed residence hall featuring two-room and four-room suites.  It is currently unused for housing.

Tiger Village II 
In 2010, the co-ed Tiger Village II opened, a 300-bed residence hall that features two-bedroom apartments.

Shannon Hall 
One of the two older dorm facilities on campus is used to house overflow from Tiger Village I and II.

Floyd Hall 
One of the two older dorm facilities on campus is used to house overflow from Tiger Village I and II.  It is currently unoccupied.

Financial Aid 
South Georgia State College's Financial Aid Office awards over $3 million in assistance every year. Seven out of 10 SGSC students receive financial aid in the form of scholarships, grants, loans or through the federal work-study program. South Georgia State College offers several dozen merit-based scholarships through the South Georgia College Foundation and the James M. Dye Foundation. Many scholarships are merit-based, but others are granted depending on a student's financial situation.

Athletics 
South Georgia State College currently sponsors 9 NJCAA Division I teams: baseball, softball, men's and women's cross country, men's and women's swimming, men's basketball, and women's soccer. South Georgia State College is a member of the Georgia Collegiate Athletic Association and the National Junior College Athletic Association.

SGSC charges a fee to each student that enrolls at the school (called the "Athletic Fee"). The fee is charged every semester along with other academic fees. The athletic fee allows students to use their Student Identification Card for access to all athletic events.

SGSC students may also participate in intramural sports: flag football, basketball, softball, Ultimate Frisbee, and much more. Other activities include tennis, weightlifting, golf, table tennis, billiards, and volleyball.

Main buildings

National Register of Historic Places
These building and some others are listed as contributing buildings to the Eleventh District A & M School-South Georgia College Historic District on the National Register of Historic Places.

Other buildings

Waycross campus photos

Notable alumni

  Kaela Ebanks - international soccer player

References

External links
Official website
New Georgia Encyclopedia: South Georgia College

 
Buildings and structures in Coffee County, Georgia
Education in Coffee County, Georgia
Educational institutions established in 1906
1906 establishments in Georgia (U.S. state)
Universities and colleges accredited by the Southern Association of Colleges and Schools
Public universities and colleges in Georgia (U.S. state)
Historic districts on the National Register of Historic Places in Georgia (U.S. state)
National Register of Historic Places in Coffee County, Georgia